Amphelictus bicolor is a species of beetle in the family Cerambycidae.

References

Amphelictus
Beetles described in 1964